Cambridgea (common name New Zealand sheetweb spider, bush spider) is a spider genus in the family Desidae and some of the first endemic spiders described from New Zealand. They are known for constructing large horizontal sheet webs measuring up to a square metre in larger species. Cambridgea were originally assigned to the Agelenidae by Dalmas in 1917 but were reassigned to the Stiphidiidae in 1973. Most recently, both Cambridgea and sister genus Nanocambridgea were reassigned to the Desidae, subfamily Porteriinae on the basis of molecular evidence.

Description 
Cambridgea are medium to large arboreal spiders, with body lengths ranging from approximately 6-10mm in the case of Cambridgea reinga to about 20mm in the case of Cambridgea foliata. They have long legs and porrect chelicerae which are significantly longer in adult males compared to adult females. Male pedipalps are characterised by a cymbium that extends well beyond the bulb and species can be differentiated by the morphology of the male tibial apophyses and female epigyne.

Behaviour

Male-male competition 
In the summer, following maturation, adult males depart their natal webs at night and wander in search of receptive females. During this time males will frequently wander into homes, sometimes getting stuck in bathtubs. Having found a female's web, males will defend the web and fight any rival males that subsequently arrive in her web. Fights proceed through clear stages of escalation. In some species males will first signal to each other by creating distortions in the mainsheet by shaking their bodies or by drumming their first pairs of legs and pedipalps on the web. Unless one male withdraws from the web, these contests will escalate to sparring, in which males push at each other with their first two pairs of legs. Some fights will escalate further into grappling in which males lock their chelicerae together and push against one another. Fights rarely result in injury.

Web building 
Cambridgea are known for building characteristic, three-dimensional sheet webs consisting of a thick, horizontal mainsheet guyed from below with anchoring threads and with a large number of knock-down threads above the mainsheet to intercept flying insects. The "rear" of the web attaches to a silken retreat which extends a short distance into crevices. The size of webs can vary significantly. Some species build sheet webs with mainsheets of up to one square metre, while some species (e.g. Cambridgea quadromaculata) do not build webs at all. Those Cambridgea that do build webs run along the underside of the mainsheet rather than along the top as some sheet-web spiders do (e.g. Corasoides).

Species
, the World Spider Catalog accepted the following species.
 Cambridgea agrestis Forster & Wilton, 1973 — New Zealand
 Cambridgea ambigua Blest & Vink, 2000 — New Zealand
 Cambridgea annulata Dalmas, 1917 — Chatham Islands
 Cambridgea antipodiana (White, 1849) — New Zealand
 Cambridgea arboricola (Urquhart, 1891) — New Zealand
 Cambridgea australis Blest & Vink, 2000 — New Zealand
 Cambridgea decorata Blest & Vink, 2000 — New Zealand
 Cambridgea elegans Blest & Vink, 2000 — New Zealand
 Cambridgea elongata Blest & Vink, 2000 — New Zealand
 Cambridgea fasciata L. Koch, 1872 — New Zealand
 Cambridgea foliata (L. Koch, 1872) — New Zealand
 Cambridgea inaequalis Blest & Vink, 2000 — New Zealand
 Cambridgea insulana Blest & Vink, 2000 — New Zealand
 Cambridgea longipes Blest & Vink, 2000 — New Zealand
 Cambridgea mercurialis Blest & Vink, 2000 — New Zealand
 Cambridgea obscura Blest & Vink, 2000 — New Zealand
 Cambridgea occidentalis Forster & Wilton, 1973 — New Zealand
 Cambridgea ordishi Blest & Vink, 2000 — New Zealand
 Cambridgea pallidula Blest & Vink, 2000 — New Zealand
 Cambridgea peculiaris Forster & Wilton, 1973 — New Zealand
 Cambridgea peelensis Blest & Vink, 2000 — New Zealand
 Cambridgea plagiata Forster & Wilton, 1973 — New Zealand
 Cambridgea quadromaculata Blest & Taylor, 1995 — New Zealand
 Cambridgea ramsayi Forster & Wilton, 1973 — New Zealand
 Cambridgea reinga Forster & Wilton, 1973 — New Zealand
 Cambridgea secunda Forster & Wilton, 1973 — New Zealand
 Cambridgea simoni Berland, 1924 — New Caledonia
 Cambridgea solanderensis Blest & Vink, 2000 — New Zealand
 Cambridgea sylvatica Forster & Wilton, 1973 — New Zealand
 Cambridgea tuiae Blest & Vink, 2000 — New Zealand
 Cambridgea turbotti Forster & Wilton, 1973 — New Zealand

See also
 List of Desidae species

References

External links

Desidae
Araneomorphae genera
Spiders of New Zealand